Surface-supplied diving is diving using equipment supplied with breathing gas using a diver's umbilical from the surface, either from the shore or from a diving support vessel, sometimes indirectly via a diving bell. This is different from scuba diving, where the diver's breathing equipment is completely self-contained and there is no link to the surface. The primary advantages of conventional surface supplied diving are lower risk of drowning and considerably larger breathing gas supply than scuba, allowing longer working periods and safer decompression. Disadvantages are the absolute limitation on diver mobility imposed by the length of the umbilical, encumbrance by the umbilical, and high logistical and equipment costs compared with scuba. The disadvantages restrict use of this mode of diving to applications where the diver operates within a small area, which is common in commercial diving work.

The copper helmeted free-flow standard diving dress is the version which made commercial diving a viable occupation, and although still used in some regions, this heavy equipment has been  superseded by lighter free-flow helmets, and to a large extent, lightweight demand helmets, band masks and full-face diving masks. Breathing gases used include air, heliox, nitrox and trimix.

Saturation diving is a mode of surface supplied diving in which the divers live under pressure in a saturation system or underwater habitat and are decompressed only at the end of a tour of duty.

Airline, or hookah diving, and "compressor diving" are lower technology variants also using a breathing air supply from the surface.

Variations 
There are several arrangements for supplying breathing gas to divers from the surface:
 Surface oriented diving, with or without a stage or open bell, where the diver is decompressed during the ascent or by surface decompression. 
 Bell bounce diving, where the divers are transported through the water in a closed bell and locked into a surface decompression chamber for decompression, or decompressed in the bell.
 Saturation diving, where the diver is transferred under pressure from the pressurised accommodation to working depth and back in a closed bell, only decompressing once at the end of the contract. 
 Standard or Heavy gear – The historical copper helmet, canvas suit and weighted boots.
 Scuba replacement – A surface-supplied arrangement where both the primary and reserve air supplies are from high-pressure cylinders. The rest of the system is identical to the standard surface supply configuration, and the full umbilical system, bailout cylinder, communications and surface air panel are used. This is more portable than most compressors and is used by commercial diving contractors as a substitute for scuba with most of the advantages and disadvantages of a regular compressor fed surface supply.
Air-line diving uses an air line hose in place of a full diver's umbilical to supply breathing air from the surface. If any of the required components of a diver's umbilical are absent this term applies. There are subcatgories of air-line diving equipment:
 Hookah – A basic form of surface-supplied diving in which the air supply is via a single hose is often referred to as airline or Hookah (occasionally Hooka) diving. This often uses a standard scuba second stage as the delivery unit, but is also used with light full-face masks. Bailout gas may be carried, but this is not always the case. Commercial diamond divers working in the shallow zone off the west coast of South Africa under the codes of practice of the Department of Minerals and Energy use half mask and demand valve hookah, and no bailout as standard practice. Their safety record is relatively poor, as a bailout cylinder is seldom carried.  It is claimed that when done using a diving compressor with suitable breathing air quality filters and an appropriate emergency gas supply, hookah diving is not more dangerous than scuba diving in the same conditions. A concern is that if the diver is supplied from a compressor in a boat, the intake must be clear of any exhaust fumes.
 Snuba and SASUBA – A system used to supply air from a cylinder mounted on a float to a recreational diver tethered by a short (approximately 6m) hose through a scuba regulator.
Compressor diving – An even more basic system is the "Compressor diving" arrangement used in the Philippines and Caribbean for fishing. This rudimentary and highly hazardous system uses a large number of small bore plastic tubes connected to a single compressor to supply a large number of divers simultaneously. The delivery end of the hose is unencumbered by any mechanism or mouthpiece, and is simply held by the divers' teeth. Air supply is free flow and often unfiltered, and varies with depth and number of divers drawing off the system.

Alternatives 
 Scuba, which is commonly used in recreational diving, is the main alternative to surface-supplied diving equipment. Scuba is available in open circuit and rebreather configurations.
 Atmospheric diving suits such as the JIM suit and the Newtsuit isolate the occupant from the ambient pressure, but are bulky and extremely expensive.
 Manned and unmanned submersibles (ROVs and AUVs) have their applications, but lack the dexterity of a diver at present (2011).
 Freediving, or breathhold diving, is extremely limited in duration and relatively high risk.

Application 

Surface-supplied diving equipment and techniques are mainly used in professional diving due to the greater cost and complexity of owning and operating the equipment. This type of equipment is used in saturation diving, as the gas supply is relatively secure, and the diver can not bail out to the surface, and for diving in contaminated water, where the diver must be protected from the environment, and helmets are generally used for environmental isolation.

There has been development of low-cost airline systems for shallow recreational diving, where limited training is offset by physically limiting the depth accessible.

History

The first successful surface-supplied diving dress equipment was produced by the brothers Charles and John Deane in the 1820s. Inspired by a fire accident he witnessed in a stable in England, he designed and patented a "Smoke Helmet" to be used by firemen in smoke-filled areas in 1823. The apparatus comprised a copper helmet with an attached flexible collar and garment. A long leather hose attached to the rear of the helmet was to be used to supply air - the original concept being that it would be pumped using a double bellows. A short pipe allowed breathed air to escape. The garment was constructed from leather or airtight cloth, secured by straps.

The brothers had insufficient funds to build the equipment themselves, so they sold the patent to their employer, Edward Barnard. It was not until 1827 that the first smoke helmets were built, by German-born British engineer Augustus Siebe. In 1828 they decided to find another application for their device and converted it into a diving helmet. They marketed the helmet with a loosely attached "diving suit" so that a diver could perform salvage work but only in a full vertical position, otherwise water entered the suit.

In 1829 the Deane brothers sailed from Whitstable for trials of their new underwater apparatus, establishing the diving industry in the town. In 1836, John Deane recovered timbers, guns, longbows, and other items from the rediscovered Mary Rose shipwreck.
By 1836 the Deane brothers had produced the world's first diving manual, Method of Using Deane's Patent Diving Apparatus which explained in detail the workings of the apparatus and pump, plus safety precautions.

In the 1830s the Deane brothers asked Siebe to apply his skill to improve their underwater helmet design. Expanding on improvements already made by another engineer, George Edwards, Siebe produced his own design; a helmet fitted to a full-length watertight canvas diving suit. The real success of the equipment was a valve in the helmet.

Siebe introduced various modifications on his diving dress design to accommodate the requirements of the salvage team on the wreck of HMS Royal George, including making the helmet be detachable from the corselet; his improved design gave rise to the typical standard diving dress which revolutionised underwater civil engineering, underwater salvage, commercial diving and naval diving.

Equipment

The essential aspect of surface-supplied diving is that breathing gas is supplied from the surface, either from a specialized diving compressor, high-pressure cylinders, or both. In commercial and military surface-supplied diving, a backup source of surface-supplied breathing gas should always be present in case the primary supply fails. The diver may also wear a bailout cylinder which can provide self-contained breathing gas in an emergency. Thus, the surface-supplied diver is less likely to have an "out-of-air" emergency than a scuba diver using a single gas supply, as there are normally two alternative breathing gas sources available. Surface-supplied diving equipment usually includes communication capability with the surface, which adds to the safety and efficiency of the working diver. 

The equipment needed for surface supplied diving can be broadly grouped as diving and support equipment, but the distinction is not always clear. Diving support equipment is the equipment used to facilitate a diving operation. It is either not taken into the water during the dive, such as the gas panel and compressor, or is not integral to the actual diving, being there to make the dive easier or safer, such as a surface decompression chamber. Some equipment, like a diving stage, is not easily categorised as diving or support equipment, and may be considered as either. 

Surface-supplied diving equipment is required for a large proportion of the commercial diving operations conducted in many countries, either by direct legislation, or by authorised codes of practice, as in the case of IMCA operations. Surface-supplied equipment is also required under the US Navy operational guidance for diving in harsh contaminated environments which was drawn up by the Navy Experimental Diving Unit.

Breathing apparatus
The definitive equipment for surface-supplied diving is the breathing apparatus which is supplied with primary breathing gas from the surface via a hose, which is usually part of a diver's umbilical connecting the surface supply systems with the diver, sometimes directly, otherwise via a bell umbilical and bell panel.

Lightweight demand helmets

Lightweight demand helmets are rigid structures which fully enclose the head of the diver and supply breathing gas "on demand". The flow of gas from the supply line is activated by inhalation reducing the pressure in the helmet to slightly below ambient, and a diaphragm in the demand valve senses this pressure difference and moves a lever to open the valve to allow breathing gas to flow into the helmet. This flow continues until the pressure inside the helmet again balances the ambient pressure and the lever returns to the shut position. This is exactly the same principle as used for scuba demand valves, and in some cases the same components are used. Sensitivity of the lever can often be adjusted by the diver by turning a knob on the side of the demand valve. Lightweight demand helmets are available in open circuit systems (used when breathing standard air) and closed circuit (reclaim) systems (which may be used in order to reduce costs when breathing mixed gas such as heliox and trimix: the exhaled gas is returned to the surface, scrubbed of carbon dioxide, re-oxygenated, and returned to the diver).

The helmet may be of metal or reinforced plastic composite (GRP), and is either connected to a neck dam or clamped directly to a drysuit. The neck dam is the lower part of the helmet, which seals against the neck of the diver in the same way that the neck seal of a dry suit works. Neck dams may have neoprene or latex seals, depending on diver preference. Attachment to the neck dam is critical to diver safety and a reliable locking mechanism is needed to ensure that it is not inadvertently released during a dive. When using a dry suit, the neck dam may be permanently omitted and the lower part of the helmet assembly attached directly to the suit.

The term "Lightweight" is relative; the helmets are only light in comparison with the old copper hats. They are supported only by the head and neck of the diver, and are uncomfortably heavy (Weight of KM 77 = 32.43 pounds) out of the water, as they must be ballasted for neutral buoyancy during the dive, so they don't tend to lift the diver's head with excess buoyancy. There is little difference in weight between the metal shell and GRP shell helmets because of this ballasting, and the weight is directly proportional to the total volume - smaller helmets are lighter. To avoid fatigue, divers avoid donning the helmet until just prior to entering the water. Having the helmet supported by the head has the advantage that the diver can turn the helmet to face the job without having to turn the entire upper torso. This is particularly an advantage when looking upwards. This allows the helmet to have a relatively small faceplate, which reduces overall volume and hence the weight.

Demand breathing systems reduce the amount of gas required to adequately ventilate the diver, as it needs only to be supplied when the diver inhales, but the slightly increased work of breathing caused by this system is a disadvantage at extreme levels of exertion, where free-flow systems may be better. The demand system is also quieter than free-flow, particularly during the non-inhalation phase of breathing. This can make voice communication more effective. The breathing of the diver is also audible to the surface team over the communications system, and this helps to monitor the condition of the diver and is a valuable safety feature.

Open circuit demand helmets

The open circuit demand system exhausts gas to the environment at ambient pressure (or a very small difference from ambient pressure required to open the exhaust valve). As a result, all exhaled gas is lost to the surroundings. For most surface orientated commercial diving where air is the breathing gas in use, this is no problem, as air is cheap and freely available. Even with nitrox it is generally more cost effective to use open circuit, as oxygen is an easily available and relatively inexpensive gas, and blending nitrox is technologically simple, both to mix and to analyse.

Reclaim helmets

In the case of compressed air, or Nitrox mixtures, the exhaled gas is not valuable enough to justify the expense of recycling, but helium-based mixtures are considerably more expensive, and as the depth increases, the amount of gas used (in terms of mass, or number of molecules) increases in direct proportion to the ambient pressure. As a result, gas cost is a significant factor in deep open circuit diving with helium-based mixtures for long periods. By using a return line for the exhaled gas, it can be recompressed and used again, almost indefinitely. It is necessary to remove carbon dioxide from the reclaimed gas, but this is relatively cheap and uncomplicated. It is generally removed by a scrubber, which is a filter packed with a chemical which reacts with and removes the carbon dioxide from the gas. The reclaimed gas is also filtered to remove odour and microorganisms, and oxygen is added to the required concentration. The gas is compressed for storage between uses.
There is a technical problem with recovery of the exhaled gas. Simply venting it to a return hose through a non-return valve will not work, as the hose must be maintained at exactly the ambient pressure at the depth of the helmet, otherwise the gas from the helmet will either free-flow out under pressure, or not flow out at all because of back pressure. This obstacle is overcome by using an exhaust valve working on the same principle as the demand valve, which opens the exhaust valve by using the leverage of a diaphragm sensing the pressure difference between the helmet interior pressure and the ambient pressure, This only requires the pressure in the reclaim hose to be lower than ambient at the diver to function. The same principle is used in a diving chamber's built-in breathing system (BIBS).

Free flow helmet

A free flow helmet supplies a continuous flow of air to the diver, and he breathes this as it flows past. Work of breathing is minimal, but flow rate must be high if the diver works hard, and this is noisy, affecting communications and requiring hearing protection to avoid damage to the ears. This type of helmet is popular where divers have to work hard in relatively shallow water for long periods. It is also useful when diving in contaminated environments, where the helmet is sealed onto a dry suit, and the entire system is kept at a slight positive pressure by adjusting the back-pressure of the exhaust valve, to ensure that there is no leakage into the helmet. This type of helmet is often large in volume, and as it is attached to the suit, it does not move with the head. The diver must move his body to face anything he wants to see. For this reason the faceplate is large and there is often an upper window or side windows to improve the field of vision.

Standard diving helmet (Copper hat)

 
The helmet is usually made of two main parts: the bonnet, which covers the diver's head, and the corselet which supports the weight of the helmet on the diver's shoulders, and is clamped to the suit to create a watertight seal. The bonnet is attached and sealed to the corselet at the neck, either by bolts or an interrupted screw-thread, with some form of locking mechanism.

The helmet may be described by the number of bolts which hold it to the suit or to the corselet, and the number of vision ports, known as lights. For example, a helmet with four vision ports, and twelve studs securing the suit to the corselet, would be known as a "four light, twelve bolt helmet", and a three-bolt helmet used three bolts to secure the bonnet to the corselet, clamping the flange of the neck seal between the two parts of the helmet.

When the telephone was invented, it was applied to the standard diving dress for greatly improved communication with the diver.

The bonnet is usually a copper shell with soldered brass fittings. It covers the diver's head and provides sufficient space to turn the head to look out of the glazed faceplate and other viewports (windows). The front port can usually be opened for ventilation and communication when the diver is on deck, by being screwed out or swung to the side on a hinge. The other lights (another name for the viewports) are generally fixed. Viewports were glass on the early helmets, with some of the later helmets using acrylic, and are usually protected by brass or bronze grilles. The helmet has fittings to connect the air line and the diver's telephone.
 
All except the earliest helmets include a non-return valve where the airline is connected, which prevents potentially fatal helmet squeeze if the pressure in the hose is lost.
The difference in pressure between the surface and the diver can be so great that if the air line is cut at or near the surface and there is no non-return valve, the diver would be partly squeezed into the helmet by the external pressure, and injured or possibly killed.

Helmets also have a spring-loaded exhaust valve which allows excess air to leave the helmet. The spring force is adjustable by the diver to prevent the suit from deflating completely or over-inflating and the diver being floated uncontrollably to the surface. Some helmets have an extra manual valve known as a spit-cock, which can be used to vent excess air when the diver is in a position where the main exhaust can not function correctly.

The corselet, also known as a breastplate or gorget, is an oval or rectangular collar-piece resting on the shoulders, chest and back, to support the helmet and seal it to the suit, usually made from copper and brass, but occasionally steel. The helmet is usually connected to the suit by placing the holes around the rubberised collar of the suit over bolts along the rim of the corselet, and then clamping the brass straps known as brailes against the collar with wing nuts to press the rubber against the metal of the corselet rim to make a  water-tight seal. An alternative method was to bolt the bonnet to the corselet over a rubber collar bonded to the top of the suit.

Most six and twelve bolt bonnets are joined to the corselet by 1/8th turn interrupted thread. The helmet neck thread is placed onto the neck of the corselet facing the divers left front, where the threads do not engage, and then rotated forward, engaging the thread and seating on a leather gasket to make a watertight seal. The helmet usually has a safety lock which prevents the bonnet from rotating back and separating underwater. Other styles of connection are also used, with the joint secured by clamps or bolts (usually three).

Band mask

A band mask is a heavy duty full-face mask with many of the characteristics of a lightweight demand helmet. In structure it is the front section of a lightweight helmet from above the faceplate to below the demand valve and exhaust ports, including the bailout block and communications connections on the sides. This rigid frame is attached to a neoprene hood by a metal clamping band, hence the name. It is provided with a padded sealing surface around the frame edge which is held firmly against the diver's face by a rubber "spider", a multiple strap arrangement with a pad behind the diver's head, and usually five straps which hook onto pins on the band. The straps have several holes so the tension can be adjusted to get a comfortable seal. A band mask is heavier than other full face masks, but lighter than a helmet, and can be donned more quickly than a helmet. They are often used by the standby diver for this reason.

Full-face mask

A full-face mask encloses both mouth and nose, which reduces the risk of the diver losing the air supply compared to a half mask and demand valve. Some models require a bailout block to provide alternative breathing gas supply from the umbilical and bailout cylinder, but are not suitable for accepting an alternative air supply from a rescue diver, while a few models accept a secondary demand valve which can be plugged into an accessory port (Draeger, Apeks and Ocean Reef). The unique Kirby Morgan 48 SuperMask has a removable DV pod which can be unclipped to allow the diver to breathe from a standard scuba demand valve with mouthpiece.

Despite the improvement in diver safety provided by the more secure attachment of the breathing apparatus to the diver's face, some models of full face mask can fail catastrophically if the faceplate is broken or detached from the skirt, as there is then no way to breathe from the mask. This can be mitigated by carrying a standard secondary second stage, and preferably also a spare half mask.

A full face mask is lighter and more comfortable for swimming than a helmet or band mask, and usually provides an improved field of vision, but it is not as secure, and does not provide the same level of protection as the heavier and more sturdily constructed equipment. The two types of equipment have different ranges of application. Most full face masks are adaptable for use with scuba or surface supply. The full face mask does not usually have a bailout block fitted, and this is usually attached to the diver's harness, with a single hose to supply the mask from main or bailout gas which is selected at the block. The strap arrangement for full face masks is usually quite secure, but not as secure as a bandmask or helmet, and it is possible for it to be dislodged in the water. However it is also quite practicable for a trained diver to replace and clear a full face mask under water without assistance, so this is more an inconvenience than a disaster unless the diver is rendered unconscious at the same time.

Breathing gas supply

Diver's umbilical

The umbilical contains a hose to supply the breathing gas and usually several other components. These usually include a communications cable (comms wire), a pneumofathometer, and a strength member, which may be the airline hose, communications cable, or a rope. When needed, a hot water supply line, helium reclaim line, video camera and lighting cables may be included. These components are neatly twisted into a multistrand cable, and are deployed as a single unit. The diver's end has underwater connectors for the electrical cables, and the air hoses are usually connected to the helmet, band mask, or bailout block by JIC fittings. A screw-gate carabiner or similar connector is provided on the strength member for attachment to the diver's harness, and may be used to lift the diver in an emergency. Similar connections are provided for attachment to the diving bell, if used, or to the surface gas panel and communications equipment. A diver's umbilical supplied from a bell gas panel is called an excursion umbilical, and the supply from the surface to the bell panel is the bell umbilical.

Air line

Hookah,  and Snuba systems are categorised as "air line" equipment, as they do not include the communication, lifeline and pneumofathometer hose characteristic of a full diver's umbilical. Most hookah diving uses a demand system based on a standard scuba second stage, but there have been special purpose free-flow full-face masks specifically intended for hookah diving (see photos). A bailout system, or emergency gas supply (EGS) is not an inherent part of an airline diving system, though it may be required in some applications.

Their field of application is very different from full surface-supplied diving. Hookah is generally used for shallow water work in low-hazard applications, such as archaeology, aquaculture, and aquarium maintenance work, but is also sometimes used for open water hunting and gathering of seafood, shallow water mining of gold and diamonds in rivers and streams, and bottom cleaning and other underwater maintenance of boats. Sasuba and Snuba are mainly a shallow water recreational application for low-hazard sites. Sasuba  and hookah diving equipment is also used for yacht or boat maintenance and hull cleaning, swimming pool maintenance, shallow underwater inspections.

The systems used to supply air through the hose to a demand valve mouthpiece, are either 12-volt electrical air pumps, gasoline engine powered low-pressure compressors, or floating scuba cylinders with high pressure regulators. These hookah diving systems usually limit the hose length to allow less than 7 metres depth. The exception is the gasoline engine powered unit, which requires a much higher level of training and topside supervision for safe use.

Divers work shifts of about two hours with a crowbar and a suction hose, are heavily weighted to stay in place while working, and the standard method of ascent is to ditch the weighted harness and regulator and make a free swimming ascent. The next diver will free dive down the airline, fit the regulator and wriggle into the harness before continuing with the job. Until the South African abalone fishery was closed, hookah was the only mode of diving permitted for harvesting wild abalone, and several aspects of this practice were in direct contravention of the diving regulations at the time. Abalone divers were not allowed to have a standby diver on the boat.

Gas panel

A gas panel or gas manifold is the control equipment for supplying the breathing gas to the divers. Primary and reserve gas is supplied to the panel through shutoff valves from a low-pressure compressor or high-pressure storage cylinders ("bombs", "bundles", "quads", or "kellys"). The gas pressure may be controlled at the panel by an industrial pressure regulator, or it may already be regulated closer to the source (at the compressor, or at the storage cylinder outlet). The supply gas pressure is monitored on a gauge at the panel, and an over-pressure valve is fitted in case the supply pressure is too high. The gas panel may be operated by the diving supervisor if the breathing gas is air or a fixed ratio premix, but if the composition must be controlled or monitored during the dive it is usual for a dedicated gas panel operator, or "gas man" to do this work.

There is a set of valves and gauges for each diver to be supplied from the panel. These include:
 A main supply valve with non-return valve, which supplies gas to the main gas supply hose of the umbilical. This is usually a quarter-turn valve, as it must be quick to operate and obvious whether it is open or closed.
 A pneumofathometer supply valve, which supplies gas to the pneumofathometer for the diver. This valve is usually near the main supply valve but with a different handle. It is usually a needle type valve as it must be finely adjustable, but it must also be large enough to allow a fairly high flow rate, as the air may be used as an alternative breathing air source, or to fill small lift bags.
 A pneumofathometer gauge is connected to the pneumo line. This is a high resolution pressure gauge calibrated in feet sea water (fsw) and/or metres sea water (msw). and is used to measure the depth of the diver by allowing air to flow through the pneumo hose and out the end attached to the diver. When the air supply is shut off, and the flow stops, the gauge indicates the pressure at the open end at the diver.
 Each pneumofathometer gauge has an overpressure valve to protect it against gas supply at higher pressure than it is designed to take. This is essential as the main supply pressure is significantly higher than the maximum depth pressure on the pneumo gauge. There is also often a snubbing valve or orifice between the pneumo line and the gauge to restrict flow into the gauge and ensure that the overpressure valve can adequately relieve the pressure.
 Some gas panels have a separate supply gauge for each diver downstream of the supply valve, but this is not standard practice.
The gas panel may be fairly large and mounted on a board for convenience of use, or may be compact and mounted inside a portable box, for ease of transport. Gas panels are usually for one, two or three divers. In some countries, or under some codes of practice, the surface standby diver must be supplied from a separate panel to the working diver/s.

A wet or closed bell will be fitted with a bell gas panel to supply gas to the divers' excursion umbilicals. The bell gas panel is supplied with primary gas from the surface via a bell umbilical, and on-board emergency gas from high-pressure storage cylinders mounted on the frame of the bell.

Pneumofathometer 
A Pneumofathometer is a device used to measure the depth of a diver by displaying the back-pressure on a gas supply hose with an open end at the diver, and a flow rate with negligible resistance in the hose. The pressure indicated is the hydrostic pressure at the depth of the open end, and is usually displayed in units of metres or feet of seawater, the same units used for decompression calculations.

The pneumo line is usually a  bore hose in the diver's umbilical, supplied with breathing gas from the gas panel via a supply valve. Downstream from the valve there is a branch to a high resolution pressure gauge, a restriction to flow to the gauge, and an overpressure relief valve to protect the gauge from full panel supply pressure in case the pneumo line is used for emergency breathing gas supply. Each diver has an independent pneumofathometer, and if there is a bell, it will also have an independent pneumofathometer.

Low-pressure breathing air compressor

A low-pressure compressor is often the air supply of choice for surface-supplied diving, as it is virtually unlimited in the amount of air it can supply, provided the delivery volume and pressure are adequate for the application. A low-pressure compressor can run for tens of hours, needing only refueling, periodical filter drainage and occasional running checks, and is therefore more convenient than high-pressure storage cylinders for primary air supply.

It is however, critical to diver safety that the compressor is suitable for breathing air delivery, uses a suitable oil, is adequately filtered, and takes in clean and uncontaminated air. Positioning of the intake opening is important, and may have to be changed if the relative wind direction changes, to ensure that no engine exhaust gas enters the intake. Various national standards for breathing air quality may apply.

Power for portable compressors is usually a 4-stroke petrol (gasoline) engine. Larger, trailer mounted compressors, may be diesel powered. Permanently installed compressors on dive support boats are likely to be powered by 3-phase electric motors.

The compressor should be provided with an accumulator and a relief valve. The accumulator functions as an additional water trap, but the main purpose is to provide a reserve volume of pressurised air. The relief valve allows any excess air to be released back to the atmosphere while retaining the appropriate supply pressure in the accumulator.

High pressure main gas supply

The main gas supply for surface-supplied diving can be from high pressure bulk storage cylinders. When the storage cylinders are relatively portable this is known as a scuba replacement system in the commercial diving industry. The application is versatile and can ensure high quality breathing gas in places where atmospheric air is too contaminated to use through a normal low pressure compressor filter system, and is easily adaptable to a mixed gas supply and oxygen decompression provided that the breathing apparatus and gas supply system are compatible with the mixtures to be used. Scuba replacement is often used from smaller diving support vessels, for emergency work, and for hazmat diving.

Mixed breathing gases are provided from high pressure bulk storage systems for saturation diving, but these are less portable, and generally involve manifolded racks of  cylinders of approximately 50 litres water capacity arranged as quads and even larger racks of high pressure tubes. If gas reclaim systems are used, the reclaimed gas is scrubbed of carbon dioxide, filtered of other contaminants, and recompressed into high pressure cylinders for interim storage, ans is generally blended with oxygen or helium to make up the required mix for the next dive before re-use.

Decompression gas

Reducing the partial pressure of the inert gas component of the breathing mixture will accelerate decompression as the concentration gradient will be greater for a given depth. This is achieved by increasing the fraction of oxygen in the breathing gas used, whereas substitution of a different inert gas will not produce the desired effect. Any substitution may introduce counter-diffusion complications, owing to differing rates of diffusion of the inert gases, which can lead to a net gain in total dissolved gas tension in a tissue. This can lead to bubble formation and growth, with decompression sickness as a consequence. Partial pressure of oxygen is usually limited to 1.6 bar during in water decompression for scuba divers, but can be up to 1.9 bar in-water and 2.2 bar in the chamber when using the US Navy tables for surface decompression,

High-pressure reserve gas
An alternative to a low-pressure compressor for gas supply is high-pressure storage cylinders feeding through a pressure regulator which will be set to the required supply pressure for the depth and equipment in use. In practice HP storage may be used for either reserve gas supply or both main and reserve gas supplies to a gas panel. High-pressure bulk cylinders are quiet in operation and provide gas of known quality (if it has been tested). This allows the relatively simple and reliable use of nitrox mixtures in surface-supplied diving. Bulk cylinders are also quiet in operation compared to a low-pressure compressor, but have the obvious limitation of amount of gas available.
The usual configurations for surface-supplied bulk gas storage are large single cylinders of around 50 litres water capacity, often referred to as "J"s or "bombs", "quads", which are a group (sometimes, but not necessarily four in number) of similar cylinders mounted on a frame and connected together to a common supply fitting, and "kellys" which are a group of "tubes" (long large volume pressure vessels) usually mounted in a container frame, and usually connected together to a common connection fitting.

Bailout gas supply

Bailout gas is usually carried by the diver in a scuba cylinder, mounted on the back of the harness in the same position as is used with recreational scuba. The size of the cylinder will depend on operational variables. There should be sufficient gas to enable the diver to reach a place of safety on the bailout gas in an emergency. For surface oriented dives, this may require gas for decompression, and bailout sets generally start at about 7 litres internal capacity and can be larger.

Bell diving bailout options: For bell dives there is no requirement for decompression gas, as the bell itself carries bailout gas. However at extreme depths the diver will use gas fast, and there have been cases where twin 10 litre 300 bar sets were required to supply sufficient gas. Another option which has been used for extreme depth is a rebreather bailout set. A limitation for this service is that the diver must be able to get in and out of the bell while wearing the bailout equipment.

Mounting options: The bailout cylinder may be mounted with the valve at the top or at the bottom, depending on local codes of practice. A generally used arrangement is to mount the cylinder with the valve up, as this is better protected while kitting up, and the cylinder valve is left fully open while the diver is in the water. This means that the regulator and supply hose to the bailout block will be pressurised during the dive, and ready for immediate use by opening the bailout valve on the harness or helmet.

The bailout block is a small manifold fitted either to the harness where it is in a convenient but protected position, commonly on the right side on the waist strap, or on the helmet, also usually on the right side of the temple, with the valve knob to the side to distinguish it from the free-flow or defogging valve which is commonly to the front. The bailout block has a connection for the main gas supply from the umbilical through a non-return valve. This route can not be closed and supplies the helmet demand valve and free flow valve under normal circumstances. The bailout gas from the back mounted cylinder passes through a conventional scuba first stage at the cylinder valve, to the bailout block, where it is normally isolated by the bailout valve. When the diver needs to switch over to bailout gas he simply opens the bailout valve and the gas is supplied to the helmet or mask. As the valve is normally closed, a leak in the first stage regulator seat will cause the interstage pressure to rise, and unless an overpressure relief valve is fitted to the first stage the hose may burst. Aftermarket overpressure valves are available which can be fitted into a standard low-pressure port of most first stages.

Bailout supply pressure options: If the interstage pressure for the bailout regulator is lower than the main supply pressure, the main supply will override the bailout gas, and continue to flow. This can be a problem if the diver switches to bailout because main supply is contaminated. If on the other hand, bailout pressure is higher than main supply pressure, the bailout gas will override the main gas supply if the valve is opened. This will result in the bailout gas being used up if the valve leaks. The diver should periodically check that bailout pressure is still sufficient for the rest of the dive, and abort the dive if it is not. For this reason the bailout regulator must be fitted with a submersible pressure gauge to which the diver can refer to check the pressure. This is usually clipped off or tucked into the harness on the left side, where it can be easily reached to read, but is unlikely to snag on anything.

Diver's harness
The diver's harness is an item of strong webbing, and sometimes cloth, which is fastened around a diver over the exposure suit, and allows the diver to be lifted without risk of falling out of the harness. Several types are in use.

Jacket harness

The jacket harness is a waistcoat (vest) style garment with strong adjustable webbing straps which are adjustable and securely buckled over the shoulders, across the chest and waist, and through the crotch or around each thigh, so that the diver can not slide out under any predictable circumstance. The harness is fitted with several heavy duty D-rings, fixed to the webbing in such a way that the full weight of the diver and all his equipment can be safely supported. A minimum strength of 500kgf is recommended or required by some codes of practice. A jacket harness is usually provided with webbing straps or a cloth pocket on the back to support the bailout cylinder, and may have a variety of pockets to carry tools, and may also carry ditchable or fixed main weights. There are usually several strong D-rings to secure the umbilical and other equipment.

Bell harness
A bell harness has the same function as a jacket harness, but lacks the cloth jacket component, and is made entirely of webbing, with a similar configuration of straps.
It too may have a means of carrying a bailout cylinder, or the bailout cylinder may be carried on a separate backpack.

Harness with buoyancy compensation
The AP Valves Mk4 Jump Jacket is a harness with integral buoyancy jacket specifically designed for commercial diving work with helmets and bells. There is a direct feed to the jacket from the main air supply, from the pneumo line and from bailout, and a system which allows the diver's pneumo to be directly connected to another diver's helmet as an emergency air supply.

Buoyancy control
Surface-supplied divers may be required to work in mid-water or on the bottom. They must be able to stay down without effort, and this usually requires weighting. When working in mid-water the diver may wish to be neutrally buoyant or negative, and when working on the bottom he will usually want to be several kilos negative.
The only time the diver may want to be positively buoyant is when on the surface or during a limited range of emergencies where uncontrolled ascent is less life-threatening than remaining under water. Surface-supplied divers generally have a secure supply of breathing gas, and there are very few occasions where weights should be jettisoned, so in most cases the surface-supplied diver weighting arrangement does not provide for quick release.

On those occasions when surface supplied divers need variable buoyancy, it may be provided by inflation of the dry suit, if used, or by a buoyancy control device similar in principle to those used by scuba divers, or both.

Weight systems

The diver needs to stay on the bottom to work some of the time, and may need to have neutral buoyancy some of the time. The diving suit is usually buoyant, so added weight is usually necessary. This can be provided in several ways. Unwanted positive buoyancy is dangerous to a diver who may need to spend significant time decompressing during the ascent, so the weights are usually attached securely to prevent accidental loss.

Weight belts 
Weight belts for surface supplied diving are usually provided with buckles which can not accidentally be released, and the weight belt is often worn under the jacket harness.

Weight harnesses 
When large amounts of weight are needed, a harness may be used to carry the load on the diver's shoulders, rather than around the waist, where it may tend to slip down into an uncomfortable position if the diver is working in a vertical posture, which is often the case. Sometimes this is a separate harness, worn under the safety harness, with pockets at the sides to carry the weights, and sometimes it is an integrated system, which carries the weight in pockets built into or externally attached to the safety harness.

Trim weights 
If the diver needs to adjust trim for greater comfort and efficiency while working, trim weights of various types may be added to the harness.

Weighted boots 
Weighted boots of several styles may be used if the diver will be working heavy. Some are in the form of clogs which strap on over the boots, and others use lead inner soles. Ankle weights are also an option, but less comfortable. These weights give the diver better stability when working upright on the bottom, which can significantly improve productivity for some kinds of work.

Environmental protection

Dry suits are better thermal protection than most wetsuits, and isolate the diver from the environment more effectively than other exposure suits. When diving in contaminated water, a drysuit with integral boots, sealed dry gloves and a helmet sealed directly to the suit provides the best environmental isolation. The suit material must be selected to be compatible with the expected contaminants. Thermal undersuits can be matched to the expected water temperature.

Hot water suits provide active warming which is particularly suitable for use with helium based breathing gases. Heated water is provided from the surface through a hose in the umbilical, and water flow can be adjusted to suit the diver's needs. Heated water continuously flows into the suit and is distributed by perforated internal tubes down the front and back of the torso and along the limbs.

The hot water supply hose of the umbilical is commonly  bore, and is connected to a supply manifold at the right hip of the suit with a set of valves which allow the diver to control flow to the front and back of the torso, and to the arms and legs, and to dump the supply to the environment if the water is too hot or too cold. The manifold distributes the water through the suit through perforated tubes. The hot-water suit is normally a one-piece neoprene wetsuit, fairly loose fitting, to fit over a neoprene undersuit, which can protect the diver from scalding if the temperature control system fails, with a zipper on the front of the torso and on the lower part of each leg. Gloves and boots are worn which receive hot water from the ends of the arm and leg hoses. If a full-face mask is worn, the hood may be supplied by a tube at the neck of the suit. Helmets do not require heating. The heating water flows out at the neck and cuffs of the suit through the overlap with gloves, boots, or hood.

Communications system

Both hard-wired (cable) and through-water electronic voice communications systems may be used with surface-supplied diving. Wired systems are more popular as there is a physical connection to the diver for gas supply in any case, and adding a cable does not change the handling characteristics of the system. Wired communications systems are still more reliable and simpler to maintain than through-water systems.

Diver's telephone
The communications equipment is relatively straightforward and may be of the two-wire or four-wire type. Two wire systems use the same wires for surface to diver and diver to surface messages, whereas four wire systems allow the diver's messages  and the surface operator's messages to use separate wire pairs.

In a two wire system the standard arrangement for diver communications is to have the diver's side normally on, so that the surface team can hear anything from the diver at all times except when the surface is sending a message. In a four-wire system the diver's side is always on, even when the surface operator is talking. This is considered an important safety feature, as the surface team can monitor the diver's breathing sounds, which can give early warning of problems developing, and confirms that the diver is alive.

Helium divers may need a decoder system (unscrambler) which reduces the frequency of the sound to make it more intelligible.

Video
Closed circuit video is now also popular, as this allows the surface personnel to see what the diver is doing, which is particularly useful for inspection work, as a non-diving specialist can see the underwater equipment in real time and direct the diver to look at particular features of interest.

Wireless systems
Dry bells may have a through water communication system fitted as a backup. This is intended to provide communications in the event that the cable is damaged, or even if the bell is completely severed from the umbilical and deployment cables.

Equipment maintenance and testing
All components of a surface supplied diving system are required to be maintained in good working condition and may be required to be tested or calibrated at specified intervals.

Diving spread
The diving spread is a commercial diving term for the topside dive site infrastructure supporting the diving operations for a diving project. The diving contractor provides the diving and support equipment and sets it up on site, usually at a place provided for the purpose by the client, or on a diving support vessel. Two types of diving spread are in common use: Air spreads for surface oriented diving operations, where the divers are deployed from normal atmospheric pressure, and decompressed back to atmospheric pressure at the end of the dive, either in-water, or in a chamber for surface decompression, using compressed air as the primary breathing gas, and saturation spreads, where divers are deployed under pressure from the saturation accommodation via a closed diving bell to the underwater worksite, and returned under pressure in the bell to the saturation accommodation system, usually breathing a helium based gas mixture. At the end of their contract the divers are decompressed to surface pressure. The process of selecting, transporting, setting up and testing the equipment is the mobilisation stage of the project, and the demobilisation involves dismantling, transportation and return to storage of the spread components.

Surface oriented mixed gas diving spreads may also be used, but are less common, and are likely to be associated with projects which are too deep for air but require only a short working time at depth.

Air spread
An air spread will include the breathing air supply equipment, and often a deck decompression chamber. Where a chamber is present, facilities for hyperbaric oxygen treatment are usually required. If the planned decompression is to be long, a diving stage or bell and the associated handling equipment is likely to be included to allow better control of ascent rate and decompression depth. Equipment for in-water or surface decompression on oxygen (SurDO2) may be available.

Equipment may be necessary to facilitate safe entry to and exit from the water, and may include extrication equipment in case the diver is injured.

Saturation spread

A saturation spread will include the closed bell and launch and recovery system, saturation habitat, breathing gas supplies and services, all the life support and control equipment, dive equipment stores and workshops, and may also include power supplies and other equipment not directly involved in the diving. It does not include the diving platform as such, for example a DP vessel, or offshore drilling rig, on which the spread is established, or other services such as catering and accommodation for the topside personnel, which would usually be provided to the dive team.

Diving procedures

There are a large number of standard procedures associated with surface-supplied diving. Some of these have their equivalents in scuba, and others are very different. Many procedures are common to all surface-supplied diving, others are specific to stage and bell operations or to saturation diving. Details will vary depending on the equipment used, as manufacturers will specify some checks and procedures in detail, and the order may vary to some extent.

The working diver
Preparation of the working diver for the dive is very much a routine, but details depend on the diving equipment and the task, and to some extent on the site, particularly aspects of accessibility.

Preparation for diving 

Before a diving operation it is usually necessary to set up the surface supply equipment. There are a number of components which must be connected in the correct order, with checks at various stages to ensure that there are no leaks and everything functions correctly. Most diving contractors will have comprehensive checklists that are used to ensure that the equipment is connected in the appropriate sequence and all checks are done. Some checks are critical to the safety of the diver. The compressor must be set up so that it gets uncontaminated air to the intake. Filters should be checked in case they need to be changed. Air supply hoses will be connected to the air panel and checked for leaks, umbilicals connected to the panels and helmets, and the communications equipment connected and tested. Before the umbilical is connected to the helmet or full face mask, the umbilical should be blown through to ensure there is no dirt inside, and the non return valve on the bailout block must be given a function test. This is important, as it is there to prevent backflow of air up the umbilical if the line is cut, and if it fails the diver may suffer a helmet squeeze, or a neck dam flood.

Compared to scuba diving, dressing the diver in is a relatively laborious process, as the equipment is bulky and fairly heavy, and several components are connected together by hoses. This is more so with helmets, and less so with light full-face masks. It is not usual for the diver to do all the dressing in without the assistance of a diver's tender, who will also manage the umbilical during the dive.
 Exposure suit – The diver will wear an exposure suit appropriate for the planned dive time, breathing gas and water temperature, and also influenced by the level of exertion expected during the dive.
 Harness – After putting on the exposure suit and checking any seals and zips, the diver will put on the harness. The topside crew will usually help as the bailout cylinder will be already mounted, and usually also attached to the helmet, making this a cumbersome procedure, easiest if the diver is seated.
 Weights – The weights will be put onto the diver at some time during the dressing procedure, but the stage where this is done depends on what weighting system is used.
 Bailout – The bailout cylinder is usually strapped to the harness and connected to the helmet before the diver is dressed in.
 Helmet – The helmet is usually put on last, as it is heavy and uncomfortable out of the water. Some divers can put on their own helmet, but it is usual for the topside crew to do most of the locking on to the neck dam, and check that there are no obvious faults with the seal.

There are a series of pre-dive checks which are done after the diver is locked into the helmet, and before he is committed to the water. These should be done every time a diver is prepared for a dive.
 Comms check – The diver and comms operator check that the voice communications system is working both ways and they can hear each other clearly. This also ensures that the operator is sure which comms channel connects to the specific diver.
 Breathing checks – The diver breathes on main air supply to ensure that the demand valve is delivering gas at low work of breathing, without free flow, and that the umbilical is connected to the correct valve on the panel.
 Bailout checks – The diver operates the bailout system to ensure that he can reach and operate the valve and it turns smoothly, the pressure in the cylinder is adequate for the planned dive profile and is ready for immediate use, and reports bailout readiness to the supervisor by "On at the tap, off at the hat, Pressure...bar" or equivalent.

Surface checks are done after the diver enters the water, but before he is allowed to descend. They are checks which can not be done as effectively, or at all, in air.
 Wet comms check – Once in the water, the comms should be checked again to make sure it is still working adequately. It is possible that water will cause the comms to fail or deteriorate when the contacts get wet.
 Helmet seal – The helmet seals and neckdam should not allow water to enter the helmet. This can only be checked when in the water.
 Pneumo bubbles – The diver calls for the air panel operator to open the pneumofathometer valve to check that the line is not blocked, and that it is connected to the correct place on the panel.

Emergency procedures

The diver must be able to deal with the following emergencies. Some are life-threatening, whereas others are more inconveniences.
Bailout to back gas, in the case of a failure of gas supply from the umbilical, or if the main air supply is contaminated.
Pneumo breathing, if the main air supply is cut, but the pneumo hose is intact. Pneumo gas can also be supplied by the standby diver
Voice communications failure is not usually an emergency, but can adversely affect work effectiveness and expose the diver to higher risk if anything else goes wrong. Ability to communicate with line signals can help here, particularly to assist in the decision whether the dive should be aborted, and if there are other more urgent problems.
Helmet flood. Depending on the severity of the flood, this can range from an annoyance to an emergency. A slow leak can be controlled by opening the free flow valve, which will drive a moderate flow of water out of the exhaust valve. A neck dam failure usually has this effect.
Broken faceplate. This is a real emergency, but very unlikely as the faceplate is usually a highly impact-resistant polymer and should not shatter. It can be mitigated by opening the free flow valve and holding the opening level, facing down, and breathing very carefully. a small hole or crack can be covered with a hand to slow the leak.
Demand valve failure. This is a minor problem if there is a free flow valve, but the dive will normally be terminated, as the bailout will not last long if needed.
Exhaust valve failure, like demand valve failure, can be dealt with by opening the free flow valve and ensuring a constant outflow of air.
Vomiting in the helmet. This can be a real emergency and life-threatening if not handled effectively, as the diver can aspirate the vomit and asphyxiate. Once again, the action is to open the free flow valve, preferably before vomiting, and to inhale as carefully as possible. If there is no free flow valve, as on a full face mask, the purge button should clear the demand valve and oro-nasal mask, and the mask can be rinsed by lifting the bottom edge away from the face to let in some water, before purging again.
Hot water supply failure. This can be life-threatening for deep heliox diving, and there is not much the diver can do but head back to the bell immediately.

Wet bell and stage emergency procedures

Emergency procedures for wet bell and diving stages include:
Loss of main gas supply to the bell
Recovery of a distressed diver to the bell
Abandonment of the bell or stage
Deployment of a surface standby diver
Loss of heated water supply for hot water suits
Voice communications failures
Dynamic positioning alarm and runout response for bell divers: Yellow and Red alerts.

Standby diver

The standby diver will be prepared in the same way as the working diver, but will not enter the water until needed. He will usually be prepared to the stage of readiness to enter the water, and then will remove his mask, or have his helmet removed and will then sit in as comfortable a place as can be found, so that in case of an emergency he can be readied for action in as short a time as possible. This often means setting up some form of shelter from the weather, and heat and sunshine are usually more of a problem than cold and wet. It is frequently necessary to cool the standby diver to avoid overheating, and dehydration can also be a problem. When the working diver is using a helmet, the stand-by diver may use a full face mask or bandmask, as this makes it quicker to get into the water in an emergency. The stand-by diver's job is to wait until something goes wrong, and then be sent in to sort it out. For this reason a stand by diver should be one of the best divers on the team regarding diving skills and strength, but does not have to be expert at the work skills for the specific job. When deployed, the standby diver will normally follow the umbilical of the diver who is in trouble, as unless it has been severed, it will reliably lead to the correct diver. The standby diver must maintain communications with the supervisor throughout the dive and is expected to give a running commentary of progress so that the supervisor and surface crew know as much as possible what is happening and can plan accordingly, and must take the necessary steps to resolve incidents, which may involve supply of emergency air or locating and rescuing an injured or unconscious diver. In bell diving, the bellman is the primary standby diver, and may have to recover a distressed diver to the bell and give first aid if necessary and possible. There will generally also be a surface standby diver in a bell operation, as some types of assistance are provided from the surface.

A rescue tether or rescue strop is a short length of rope or webbing with a clip at one or both ends, which the stand-by diver uses to clip the unresponsive diver to his harness to free up both hands during a recovery. This can be useful if he needs to climb a structure, shotline or topographical feature, and the umbilicals can not be safely used to lift the divers due to snags or sharp edges.

Bellman 

A bellman is a stand-by diver who tends the working diver's umbilical from a wet or closed bell, and is ready to go to the diver's assistance at all times. The bellman must be in effective voice communication with the supervisor.

Underwater tending point
For some operations it is necessary to control the umbilical at a point underwater. This is known as an underwater tending point, and it may be done by another diver or by the diver passing through a closed fairlead placed in the required position. This is usually done to prevent inadvertent access to a known hazard by making the length of the umbilical extending beyond the tending point too short to let the diver get to the hazard. The fairlead must constrain the umbilical laterally and vertically, while allowing free passage away from and back to the bell or stage, and should not interfere with the bellman's ability to pay out or take up slack when the diver travels to the workplace and back. It may be held in position by suspending a weighted hoop from a crane, resting a frame on the bottom, or other methods as may suit the job. Underwater tending may also be used for penetrations of enclosed spaces, such as wrecks, caves, penstocks, sewers, culverts and the like. A diving stage or basket is a by default an underwater tending point, as the umbilical passes through it from the surface to the diver, which also serves as a guide line for the diver to get back to the stage. A diving bell is also an underwater tending point, as the excursion umbilical is tended from the bell by the bellman.

Occupational health and safety issues

Divers face specific physical and health risks when they go underwater with diving equipment, or use high pressure breathing gas.

A hazard is any agent or situation that poses a level of threat to life, health, property, or environment. Most hazards remain dormant or potential, with only a theoretical risk of harm, and when a hazard becomes active, and produces undesirable consequences, it is called an incident and may culminate in an emergency or accident. Hazard and vulnerability interact with likelihood of occurrence to create risk, which can be the probability of a specific undesirable consequence of a specific hazard, or the combined probability of undesirable consequences of all the hazards of a specific activity. A hazard that is understood and acknowledged may present a lower risk if appropriate precautions are taken, and the consequences may be less severe if mitigation procedures are planned and in place.

The presence of a combination of several hazards simultaneously is common in diving, and the effect is generally increased risk to the diver, particularly where the occurrence of an incident due to one hazard triggers other hazards with a resulting cascade of incidents. Many diving fatalities are the result of a cascade of incidents overwhelming the diver, who should be able to manage any single reasonably foreseeable incident. The use of surface supplied breathing gas reduces one of the most significant hazards in diving, that of loss of breathing gas supply, and mitigates that risk by the use of a suitable emergency gas supply, usually in the form of a scuba bailout set, which is intended to provide the diver with sufficient breathing gas to reach a place of relative safety with more breathing gas available.

The risk of the diver getting lost or being unable to call for assistance is also drastically reduced in comparison with most scuba, as the diver is physically connected to the surface control point by the umbilical, making it relatively simple for the standby diver to get to a diver in distress, and the standard application of hard-wired voice communications allows the surface team to constantly monitor the diver's breathing sounds.

The assessed risk of a dive would generally be considered unacceptable if the diver is not expected to cope with any single reasonably foreseeable incident with a significant probability of occurrence during that dive. Precisely where the line is drawn depends on circumstances. Professional diving operations tend to be less tolerant of risk than recreational, particularly technical divers, who are less constrained by occupational health and safety legislation and codes of practice. This is one of the factors driving the use of surface supplied equipment where reasonably practicable for professional work.

Diving disorders are medical conditions specifically arising from underwater diving. The signs and symptoms of these may present during a dive, on surfacing, or up to several hours after a dive. Surface supplied  divers have to breathe a gas which is at the same pressure as their surroundings (ambient pressure), which can be much greater than on the surface.

The principal disorders are: decompression illness (which covers decompression sickness and arterial gas embolism); nitrogen narcosis; high pressure nervous syndrome; oxygen toxicity; and pulmonary barotrauma (burst lung). Although some of these may occur in other settings, they are of particular concern during diving activities. Long term diving disorders include dysbaric osteonecrosis, which is associated with decompression sickness. These disorders are caused by breathing gas at the high pressures encountered at depth, and divers may breathe a gas mixture different from air to mitigate these effects. Helium may be added to reduce the amount of nitrogen and oxygen in the gas mixture when diving deeper, to reduce the effects of narcosis and to avoid the risk of oxygen toxicity. More exotic mixtures such as hydreliox, a hydrogen–helium–oxygen mixture, are used at extreme depths to counteract this.

Compressor diving
Compressor diving is a method of surface-supplied diving used in some tropical sea areas including the Philippines and the Caribbean. The divers swim with a half mask covering the eyes-and-nose and (often home-made) fins and are supplied air from the boat by plastic hoses from an industrial low-pressure air compressor of the type commonly used to supply jackhammers. There is no reduction valve; the diver holds the hose end in his mouth with no demand valve or mouthpiece. Excess air spills out through the lips.
If several people are compressor diving from the same boat, several line tenders are needed in the boat to stop the airlines from getting tangled and kinked and so blocked.

Compressor diving is the most common method used to fish for Caribbean spiny lobster (Panulirus argus) in the Caribbean. However, it is illegal because it contributes to overfishing, is environmentally destructive, and is harmful to the health of the fishers. When fishing with compressors, fishers either use gaffs or harpoons to spear lobsters immediately upon sight, killing or injuring the lobsters before they can be checked for eggs or assessed as legally sized. Compressors allow fishers to fish in deeper waters for longer periods of time, facilitating  reef damage as fishers search for lobsters hidden underneath corals and other living refuges. The misuse of compressors has also resulted in health problems for many fishers, such as respiratory problems, limb paralysis, and death due to decompression illness.

This method of diving is commonly used in Philippines waters for pa-aling fishing, which is fishing with big nets on coral reef areas where a surface-dragged net would snag on coral; the compressor air hoses are also used to make a curtain of bubbles to corral and herd the fish into the nets, since muro-ami fishing was stopped in the area. At least one pa-aling fishing fleet has been found and arrested in a protected fishery area. Compressor diving was shown, and so called, used for pa-aling fishing, in episode 1 (Oceans: Into the Blue) of the BBC television series Human Planet. The cameramen used ordinary scuba gear, but one of them had a trial-dive with the crew's compressor-diving gear.

Training and registration

Almost all surface-supplied diving is done by professional divers, and consequently the training is done by schools which specialise in the training of professional divers. Registration of professional divers is generally subject to national or state legislation, though international recognition is available for some qualifications.

See also

Notes

References

External links
Hookah:
 Introduction to hooka diving
Compressor diving
Photographs of Pa-aling compressor diving in the Philippines
BBC documentary features ‘dangerous’ fishing method in the Philippines
BBC One - Human Planet, Oceans - Into the blue. Pa-aling divers (with link to video)

Surface supplied diving procedures
Underwater breathing apparatus
Diving equipment configurations
Underwater diving safety

mk:Скафандерско нуркање
pl:Płetwonurkowanie